Benton is a town in Polk County, Tennessee, United States. The population was 1,532 at the 2020 census. It is the county seat of Polk County.

Benton is included in the Cleveland Metropolitan Statistical Area. Nancy Ward, a Cherokee known as Nanyehi, was a Beloved Woman, a leader among her people. For many years, she participated in negotiations with the British and Americans. After the American Revolution, she had an inn here and was finally buried here. The Nancy Ward Chapter of the DAR, named in her honor, has marked the graves of her and her son Fivekiller.

History
Benton was founded in 1840 as a county seat for Polk County, which had been established the previous year. The town, originally a trading post known as McKamy's stock stand, was named in honor of politician and US Senator from Missouri, Thomas Hart Benton.

On May 27, 1983 the Benton fireworks disaster occurred on a farm southeast of the city. An explosion at a secret fireworks operation killed eleven, injured one, and caused damage within a radius of several miles, revealing the illegal business. This was by far the largest and most successful known illegal fireworks operation.

Geography
Benton is located at  (35.1742411, -84.6535468). The Unicoi Mountains rise prominently to the east of Benton.

Benton is centered on the junction of U.S. Route 411, which connects the town to Etowah to the north and Tennga, Georgia to the south, and Tennessee State Route 314, which connects Benton to Parksville, Cherokee National Forest, and the Ocoee Dam area to the southeast.

One of the scenic areas around Benton is Lake McCamy, where a hiking trail leads to the Benton Falls.

Demographics

2020 census

As of the 2020 United States census, there were 1,523 people, 645 households, and 438 families residing in the town.

2000 census
As of the census of 2000, there were 1,138 people, 468 households, and 301 families residing in the town. The population density was 502.1 people per square mile (193.6/km2). There were 513 housing units at an average density of 226.3 per square mile (87.3/km2). The racial makeup of the town was 98.86% White, 0.09% African American, 0.18% Native American, 0.09% Pacific Islander, 0.09% from other races, and 0.70% from two or more races. Hispanic or Latino of any race were 0.53% of the population.

There were 468 households, out of which 26.5% had children under the age of 18 living with them, 47.6% were married couples living together, 12.8% had a female householder with no husband present, and 35.5% were non-families. 31.8% of all households were made up of individuals, and 14.5% had someone living alone who was 65 years of age or older. The average household size was 2.34 and the average family size was 2.95.

In the town, the population was spread out, with 22.7% under the age of 18, 11.1% from 18 to 24, 29.4% from 25 to 44, 22.6% from 45 to 64, and 14.2% who were 65 years of age or older. The median age was 37 years. For every 100 females, there were 91.6 males. For every 100 females age 18 and over, there were 92.6 males.

The median income for a household in the town was $22,667, and the median income for a family was $31,146. Males had a median income of $24,667 versus $23,295 for females. The per capita income for the town was $12,580. About 15.1% of families and 20.4% of the population were below the poverty line, including 34.5% of those under age 18 and 20.9% of those age 65 or over.

References

External links

Polk County Library Cooperative
Town charter

Towns in Polk County, Tennessee
Towns in Tennessee
County seats in Tennessee
Cleveland metropolitan area, Tennessee